Lunar Lander is a 1980 video game published by Adventure International.

Gameplay
Lunar Lander is a game in which the player must land a ship on the Moon, in the style of other Lunar Lander games.

This game was part of a series of arcade game clones for the TRS-80 and Atari 8-bit computers, which, though featuring differences from the Atari version of Lunar Lander, was advertised as "an arcade game simulation".

Reception
Richard McGrath reviewed the game for Computer Gaming World, and stated that "I have no real complaints. Adventure International has a winning program here. It is just as advertised--a quality version of an old standby."

Reviews
Moves #55, p31

References

External links
Lunar Lander at Atari Mania
Review in SoftSide
Review in Electronic Games
Review in ANALOG Computing
Review in 80-US

1980 video games
Adventure International games
Atari 8-bit family games
Space flight simulator games
TRS-80 games
Video games developed in the United States
Video games set on the Moon